The State of Buryat-Mongolia (Buryat: Буряад-Монгол улас ᠪᠤᠷᠢᠠᠳ ᠮᠣᠩᠭᠣᠯ ᠪᠤᠯᠤᠰ) was a buffer Buryat-Mongolian state,  during the Russian Civil War. It was established according to by the first All-Buryat congress on 25 April 1917. The main government body was Burnatskom, the Buryat National Committee.

After the collapse of the Soviet regime under the advance of the Whites and the Czechoslovakian division, the State of Buryat-Mongolia was recognized by the Soviets in 1918, and later by Grigory Semyonov's Government of Transbaikalia. 
 
The state de facto ceased to exist after the formation of the Far Eastern Republic, which divided Buryat-Mongolia in two: 4 aimags became part of the Far Eastern Republic, while the other 4 formed Buryat-Mongol autonomies of RSFSR.

History

After the declaration of independence from China in 1911 by Outer Mongolia, a national liberation movement arose in Buryat-Mongolia, which sought reunification with Mongolia. The provisional government established during the February Revolution was unable to maintain control over the distant regions of Russia, including Buryat-Mongolia, given multiple political groups: Bolsheviks, monarchists, pan-Mongolists, and others. On April 25, 1917, the First All-Buryat Congress was proclaimed, creating the State of Buryat-Mongolia. 

The project of the state was proposed by Mikhail Bogdanov. According to him, Buryat-Mongolia included the lands around Lake Baikal, inhabited by the Buryats. A striped national-territorial structure was created. The lands of Buryat-Mongolia were interspersed with lands inhabited by Russians, and the state did not have a single territory. At the First All-Buryat Congress, the division of the Buryat lands into somons, khoshuns and aimaks was adopted. The highest state body was "Buryad-Mongol ulasyn suglaan" - Burnatsky , located in Chita with a branch in Irkutsk.  Burnatsky led an independent financial policy, including collecting taxes by 1919. 

In 1918, due to the establishment of the power of Ataman Semyonov in Transbaikal, some members of the Burnatsky Committee left. In their place, supporters of the White Russians were introduced. In the autumn of 1919, Burnatsky, transformed into Burnardum, was defeated due to disagreement with Semyonov, however, he announced his departure only in October 1920.

The State of Buryat-Mongolia in 1921 was divided between the RSFSR and the Far Eastern Republic .  In the latter, the Buryat-Mongolian Autonomous Oblast was formed in April 1921 . In January 1922, the Mongolian-Buryat Autonomous Oblast was formed in the RSFSR.

Notes

References

History of Mongolia
Post–Russian Empire states
1910s establishments in Mongolia
20th-century disestablishments in Mongolia